Adel's Restaurant was a diner located on the three-way junction of College, Mendocino and B streets in Santa Rosa, California.

History and description
The property was purchased by Mike Atallah in 1986 who opened Adel's on the site not long after. At one point, a second location was opened in nearby Healdsburg but it was eventually sold off to another person. In June 2019, Atallah announced plans to close  Adel's so that he could renovate and reopen the space as a more upscale and modern restaurant called "Cafe Mimosa", which eventually opened in February 2020. Adel's was open 24 hours and the menu included typical diner fare such as its "triple meat and cheese" three egg omelettes, flame broiled burgers with "kitchen sink" toppings and liver and onions.

References

Companies based in Santa Rosa, California
1986 establishments in California
2019 disestablishments in California